Christian is a 1939 Czechoslovak comedy film directed by Martin Frič. The film is based on a French play by Yvan Noé.
It is in the style of American screwball comedies such as The Lady Eve and The Awful Truth.

Plot
Alois Novák is an uninspired clerk married to Marie. He lives a boring life and wants to feel adventure. Once in a month he attends Orient bar disguised as a rich traveller Kristian and seduces beautiful and elegant women and then leaves them broken-hearted. One day he meets Zuzana. She sees through his game and doesn't let herself be fooled. She starts to search for him which leads to many comical situations. She eventually finds him and makes Novák to return to reality. Novák leaves his Kristián persona but becomes a more confident person and more loving husband for his wife.

Cast
 Oldřich Nový as Alois Novák alias Kristián
 Nataša Gollová as Marie Nováková
 Raoul Schránil as Fred
 Bedřich Veverka as Petr
 Adina Mandlová as Fred's fiancée Zuzana Rendlová
 Jára Kohout as Travel agent Josef Novotný
 Anna Steimarová as Marie's aunt
 Jaroslav Marvan as Travel agency manager Král
 Čeněk Šlégl as Dandy with a handkerchief
 Josef Belský as Manager of the "Orient" bar
 František Paul as Waiter Robert
 Jan W. Speerger as Barman

Production
The film is based on a play by Yvan Noé. Shooting of the film took 23 days and cost 675,000 Kčs. The film premiered on 8 September 1939. In real life, the actresses who played Zuzana and Novák's wife were friends, and during World War II they competed for the affections of the producer Willy Söhnel.

Release
The film premiered on 8 September 1939. It remained in cinemas for 5 weeks. The film was re-released in theatres in 1951, but all scenes featuring Jára Kohout were cut from the film, because he emigrated in 1948.

Oldřich Nový wanted to collaborate with Martin Frič on a sequel called Christian Returns. Nový even wrote a screenplay with his wife.

References

External links
 

1939 films
1939 comedy films
Czechoslovak black-and-white films
Czechoslovak comedy films
1930s Czech-language films
Czech comedy films
Czech black-and-white films
Films directed by Martin Frič